"Arithmetic" is a single by Brooke Fraser released in 2004. The song is the first track of Fraser's debut album What to Do with Daylight. The song was later included on the Sony BMG compilation More Nature, a collection of songs from the New Zealand Sony BMG catalogue.

The song debuted on the New Zealand Singles Chart at number thirty eight on 26 July 2004 and peaked at number eight. It spent nineteen weeks on the chart.

Music clip
The film clip for "Arithmetic" features Fraser in a dimly lit studio surrounded by fairy lights and with fairy lights all over her piano. As the song only features piano and a string quartet, the quartet is also visible in another part of the studio with their music stands also lit by fairy lights. For this abundance of fairy lights, "Arithmetic" was awarded the satirical award for "Most used fairy lights in a video clip" in the 2004 Studio 2 Awards.

Track listing
Tracks 1 & 2 written by Brooke Fraser. Track 3 written by James Taylor.
"Arithmetic"
"Mystery" (Live Version)
"Something in the Way She Moves" (Live Version – James Taylor Cover)

Charts

References

2004 singles
Brooke Fraser songs
Songs written by Brooke Fraser
2003 songs
Sony BMG singles